Gilbert Plains is an unincorporated urban community in the Gilbert Plains Municipality, Manitoba, Canada, that was classified as a town prior to January 1, 2015.

It is situated on the Valley River, in the Parkland Region between Riding Mountain National Park and Duck Mountain Provincial Park.

Gilbert Plains was featured during season 3 of the CBC program Still Standing. The episode originally aired on September 5, 2017.

History 
Incorporated in 1906, the original townsite was some miles to the south. The community was named for Gilbert Ross, a Métis man who was living in the region when the first European settler, Glenlyon Campbell, arrived.

On 1 January 2015, the Town of Gilbert Plains relinquished its town status when it amalgamated with the Rural Municipality of Gilbert Plains to form the Gilbert Plains Municipality.

Demographics 

Media
A local newspaper, The Exponent, serviced both Gilbert Plains and its neighboring town, Grandview. The Exponent closed on 24 February 2017, after 117 years of operation.

Transportation
Gilbert Plains railway station receives Via Rail service. The community previously had an airport.

Climate

See also 
Gilbert Plains (electoral district)

References 

Designated places in Manitoba
Unincorporated communities in Parkland Region, Manitoba
Unincorporated urban communities in Manitoba
Former towns in Manitoba
1906 establishments in Manitoba
Populated places established in 1906
2015 disestablishments in Manitoba
Populated places disestablished in 2015